"There You Go" is a song recorded by American singer Pink for her debut studio album, Can't Take Me Home (2000). The track was co-written by Pink, Kevin "She'kspere" Briggs, and Kandi Burruss and was produced by Briggs, while Burruss produced the vocals. The song is about a relationship that the protagonist has ended, but the ex-boyfriend wants her back.

"There You Go" was released as the lead single from Can't Take Me Home on January 18, 2000, by LaFace Records and Arista Records to critical acclaim. It peaked at number seven on the US Billboard Hot 100, while peaking at numbers two and six in Australia and the United Kingdom, respectively. The single was certified gold by the Recording Industry Association of America (RIAA), selling 600,000 copies in the United States.

Critical reception
Writing for AllMusic, Stephen Thomas Erlewine called "There You Go" one of the highlights of Can't Take You Home. Rob Brunner from Entertainment Weekly stated: "Briggs's 'There You Go' is remarkably similar to his hits for Destiny's Child ('Bills, Bills, Bills') and TLC ('No Scrubs') but minus the vocal interplay that gives those tunes their punch." In their review of Can't Take Me Home, MTV Asia called the song one of the album's "edgy cuts" which had "the grooves needed to top the charts". Rolling Stone was also positive, saying: "Her debut has one awesome single in 'There You Go', whose wronged-woman sass is set to a stop-start groove so bling-bling it redeems a chorus that ends, 'Sometimes it be's like that.'" In 2013, Complex ranked the song at number 11 on their list "The Best R&B Songs by White Singers in the 2000s".

Music video
The accompanying music video for "There You Go" was directed by Dave Meyers and debuted via The Box in late November 1999. In the music video, Pink's ex-boyfriend Mikey calls her asking for a ride and she reluctantly agrees to give him one. She hops on a motorcycle and rides to the top of a parking structure overlooking his apartment, where she calls him. She then accelerates her motorcycle, jumps off the last second, and watches as it soars off the building and crashes into his apartment window before exploding into flames, burning the armchair and the PlayStation Mikey was playing on earlier in the video. Pink then jumps into a car driven by a new guy, giving Mikey the middle finger as they drive off. Entertainment Weekly described the video by saying: "In the video for 'There You Go' — her smash single — the piqued Pink freaks, sending a motorcycle crashing into Floyd's fab bachelor pad."

In 2019, Pink confessed to being under the influence of marijuana while shooting the video, to the point she was unable to keep her eyes open, explaining that "Dave Meyers kept coming up to me and saying, 'Can you wait to smoke that next blunt before the beauty shot?' I was like, 'What do you mean?'. He was like, 'I really want you to be able to open your eyes.'"

Track listings and formats

 US and European CD single
 "There You Go" (album version) – 3:26
 "There You Go" (instrumental) – 3:36

 Canadian and Australian CD single, European maxi-CD single
 "There You Go" (album version) – 3:26
 "There You Go" (Hani Num club) – 8:27
 "There You Go" (Hani radio edit) – 3:33
 "There You Go" (Hani MFF mix) – 8:39
 "There You Go" (Hani Mix Show edit) – 5:32

 UK CD single
 "There You Go" (album version) – 3:26
 "There You Go" (Hani radio edit) – 3:33
 "There You Go" (video) – 3:47

 UK cassette single
 "There You Go" (album version) – 3:26
 "There You Go" (Hani radio edit) – 3:33
 "There You Go" (instrumental) – 3:36

Credits and personnel
Credits adapted from the Australian CD single liner notes.

Studios
 Recorded at Triangle Sound Studio (Atlanta, Georgia, US)
 Mixed at Larrabee North Studios (Hollywood, California, US)
 Mastered at Powers House of Sound (New York City)

Personnel

 Pink – writing (as Alecia Moore), vocals, background vocals
 Kandi Burruss – writing, background vocals, vocal production
 Kevin "She'kspere" Briggs – writing, production, recording
 Andre Ware – recording
 Kevin "K.D." Davis – mixing
 Steve MacAuley – mixing assistant
 Herb Powers – mastering
 Antonio M. Reid, Kenneth B. Edmonds – management
 Kawn "KP" Prather, Sharon Daley – A&R direction

 Regina Davenport, Celeste Moses – A&R coordination
 Darrick "D.L." Warfield – art direction
 Cherie O'Brien – creative coordinator
 Fusion Designworks – artwork design
 Daniela Federici – photography
 Lysa Cooper – prop stylist
 Yellaka – image consultant
 Justin Henry – make-up
 Fredrick Parnell – hair

Charts

Weekly charts

Year-end charts

Certifications

Release history

References

External links
 

2000 debut singles
2000 songs
Arista Records singles
Bertelsmann Music Group singles
LaFace Records singles
Music videos directed by Dave Meyers (director)
Pink (singer) songs
Songs written by Kandi Burruss
Songs written by Kevin "She'kspere" Briggs
Songs written by Pink (singer)